Conviction is an American legal drama television series on ABC. It premiered on Monday, October 3, 2016. The series, starring Hayley Atwell, was picked up from pilot on May 12, 2016. A full trailer was released on May 17, 2016. On November 8, 2016, ABC announced there would be no back-order for more than the thirteen contracted episodes; however, the remaining episodes of the season aired until its conclusion on January 29, 2017. ABC canceled the series after one season on May 11, 2017.

Premise
Former First Daughter Hayes Morrison is blackmailed into heading the Conviction Integrity Unit, a department of the New York County District Attorney's Office comprising lawyers, detectives, and forensic experts who reexamine cases where there is suspicion of wrongful conviction. The team has only five days to prove each case.

Cast

Main
 Hayley Atwell as Hayes Morrison, the rebellious former First Daughter of the United States, party-girl, and skilled defense attorney, who graduated first in her class at Harvard. After being suspended for sleeping with her students and following her arrest for cocaine possession, she is blackmailed by the District Attorney into heading the newly formed Conviction Integrity Unit (CIU). Her mother is running for a New York US Senate seat.
 Eddie Cahill as Conner Wallace, the New York County District Attorney who created the CIU. He and Hayes met as rivals on a case in Chicago and soon started a relationship. They both struggle with their romantic feelings toward one another.
 Shawn Ashmore as Sam Spencer, an Assistant District Attorney who was originally selected to head the CIU. Although a team player, he is not happy about his demotion.
 Merrin Dungey as Maxine Bohen, a former NYPD detective who now works for the CIU as a DA investigator. She previously had an addiction to pain pills and has a minor relapse during the series.
 Emily Kinney as Tess Larson, the CIU's paralegal. She frequently assists Frankie with his experiments.
 Manny Montana as Franklin "Frankie" Cruz, an ex-con who works for the CIU as its forensic technician.
 Daniel Franzese as Jackson Morrison, Hayes' older brother and their mother's campaign manager. He and Hayes care deeply for one another and are roommates. Despite being in the main cast, Franzese only appears in seven of the thirteen episodes.

Recurring
 Bess Armstrong as Harper Morrison, Hayes' and Jackson's mother, the former First Lady who is running for the U.S. Senate. She is divorced from their father, former president Theodore Morrison.
 Sarah Allen as Lisa Crozier, a reporter digging for dirt on Hayes and the CIU.
 Nigel Gibbs as John Bohen, Maxine's father, a retired police detective who runs a local bar.
 Ilfenesh Hadera as Naomi Golden, Wallace's lawyer and both his and Hayes' ex-girlfriend.
 Alex Mallari Jr. as Matty Tan, who was falsely convicted of murder based on Tess' eyewitness testimony as a child. After five years in prison he was exonerated by DNA evidence.
 Mike Doyle as Rodney Landon, a bigoted activist planning terrorism attacks against Muslims, who reappears later in an attempt to discredit Sam and the CIU.

Episodes

Production

In March 2016, the pilot was shot in Toronto, Ontario, Canada, as was the rest of the series, primarily at Cinespace Film Studios' Kipling Avenue facility.

When the pilot was being cast, the main character's name was reported as "Carter Morrison". The character was renamed "Hayes Morrison" before the pilot was filmed.

Daniel di Tomasso, who was originally cast as Hayes' brother, was dropped after the pilot was filmed for creative reasons. Daniel Franzese was recast as his replacement starting with the pilot.

Four of the cast members left the series for other projects after production ended. Manny Montana signed to appear as a regular character on the upcoming NBC series Good Girls, Emily Kinney signed to the already ordered ABC series Ten Days in the Valley, Hayley Atwell signed to star in the BBC One/Starz miniseries Howards End and Merrin Dungey signed to co-star in the CBS comedy-pilot Brothered Up.

Reception

Critical response
Conviction has received generally negative reviews from television critics. Rotten Tomatoes shows a 20% "rotten" rating based on 41 reviews with an average score of 4.79/10. The site's critical consensus reads: "While Hayley Atwell proves a strong and likable lead, her charisma alone cannot elevate Conviction from its worn and familiar trappings." The rating on Metacritic is 45 out of 100, indicating "mixed or average reviews".

Ratings

References

External links
 
  on The Futon Critic
  on ABC

2010s American legal television series
2010s American LGBT-related drama television series
2016 American television series debuts
2017 American television series endings
American legal drama television series
American Broadcasting Company original programming
Bisexuality-related television series
English-language television shows
Television series by ABC Studios
Television series by Entertainment One
Television shows filmed in Toronto
Television shows set in New York City
Television series about prosecutors